The Spanish Supertouring Championship (Campeonato de España de Turismos) is Spain's national motorsport series for touring cars. It was established in 1966 and its drivers' title has been held by such notable drivers as Double ETCC and   champion Fabrizio Giovanardi, local idols Luis Villamil, Jordi Gene and formers F1 driver Luis Pérez-Sala and Adrian Campos.

Champions

References
Spanish Touring Car Championship :: Overview
Super Touring Register - Campeonato de España de Turismos (Results 1994-1997)

External links
Current official website

 
Touring car racing series
1969 establishments in Spain